The Magic Weekend (known as the Dacia Magic Weekend for sponsorship reasons) is an annual event organised by the Rugby Football League in which an entire round of Super League matches is played over a weekend at a single stadium to promote the sport of rugby league.

The first event was held at the Millennium Stadium in Cardiff in 2007, and subsequent events have taken place at Murrayfield Stadium, Edinburgh; the Etihad Stadium, Manchester; St James' Park, Newcastle, and Anfield, Liverpool.

Having established itself on the English rugby league calendar, the Magic Weekend formula has now been copied in other rugby league-playing nations: starting in France in 2017, and then in Australia, with the Magic Round in 2019.

Concept

The first Millennium Magic round was confirmed in September 2006 for the weekend of 5–6 May 2007. Richard Lewis, chairman of the RFL, cited both expansion and monetary reasons for the move to Wales, but the plan also allowed the Super League to be reduced by one round (critics had stated that the players were put under too much strain over the season). The event was funded and promoted by the Welsh Tourist Board, who were looking to build on the Challenge Cup finals which had taken place in Cardiff between 2003 and 2005 due to the rebuilding of Wembley Stadium. After the success of the first Millennium Magic in 2007, it became an annual fixture in the Super League calendar. The event was moved to Murrayfield Stadium in Edinburgh in 2009 following a bid from VisitScotland, and was renamed Murrayfield Magic, and later just the Magic Weekend.

History

2007: Cardiff
Three Super League XII fixtures took place on Saturday 5 May 2007, and a further three on Sunday 6 May 2007.

The games played were, where possible, 'local derby' matches in an attempt to maximise interest in the event. The two 'non-heartland' clubs in Super League at that time, Catalans Dragons (France) and Harlequins RL (London), were paired against each other. The teams would face their Millennium Magic derby opponents four times during the Super League XII season.

Celtic Crusaders opened the weekend against Oldham R.L.F.C. in a National League Two game on the Friday night (4 May) at Brewery Field, Bridgend. This match officially celebrated 100 years of club rugby league in Wales as Oldham were the first ever opponents to Merthyr Tydfil in the first professional game in Wales on 7 September 1907.  In an eventful match, Oldham came back from 26-6 down to win 34-26 in front of 3,441 fans, a record attendance for a National League 2 match.  It was also the first National League 2 game shown live on British television, covered by Sky Sports.

A 58,831 aggregate crowd saw the Magic event at the Millennium Stadium. Super League clubs agreed to repeat the event during the following season with Nigel Wood, the RFL's chief operating officer, saying: "The clubs and fans thoroughly enjoyed the day and our aim is to make next year's event even bigger and better."

2008: Cardiff
As in 2007, three Super League XIII fixtures took place on the Saturday (3 May) and a further three on the Sunday (4 May).

The event again kicked off with the local south Wales team, Celtic Crusaders, but this time they were up against Featherstone Rovers at the Brewery Field, Bridgend in a National League 1 match.  The Crusaders won the match by 28-point to 18.  The match was held in front of a club record crowd of 6,152.

2009: Edinburgh

It was confirmed after the 2008 event that the weekend was to be moved in 2009 to Murrayfield Stadium in Edinburgh, Scotland. The event included matches based on a seeded draw, using finishing positions from Super League XIII.

2010: Edinburgh
The 2010 Magic weekend took place on 1–2 May 2010 at Murrayfield. After fan criticism of the seeded draw, The RFL decided to ask all 14 Super League clubs whether they would like to revert to derbies. The result favored a seeding again where the top 8 teams faced each other, and the bottom six would play each other.

2011: Cardiff
The Magic Weekend returned to its original location at the Millennium Stadium, and it saw the opening round of the 2011 Super League season on the weekend of 12–13 February 2011. The event also returned to the original format with the majority of the games being local rivalry games.

2012: Manchester
The 2012 event was held at the Etihad Stadium, home of Manchester City Football Club, and was the first time the Magic Weekend was held in England.

The date of the Magic Weekend was changed for 2012, reverting to a mid-season game week rather than as a season opener like 2011. However, unlike the first four Magic Weekends, the matches were played over a weekend at the end of May (after the end of the football season) rather than during the May Day bank holiday weekend at the start of May. Although the last weekend of May is usually the Late Spring Bank Holiday weekend, the Spring bank holiday in 2012 was moved back a weekend as part of the Diamond Jubilee.

Following the premise of previous Magic Weekends, the majority of the fixtures were local rivalry games. 2012 was the first time that Widnes Vikings participated in the Magic Weekend. The aggregate attendance of the weekend was 63,716 (the largest ever).

2013: Manchester
The 2013 Magic Weekend was once again held at the Etihad Stadium, Manchester, on Saturday 25 and Sunday 26 May.

As in 2012, the 2013 Magic Weekend took place after the end of the football season in May, on the late Spring bank holiday weekend.

As in previous years, some of the matches were local rivalries with Castleford playing Wakefield Trinity and Hull F.C. Hull Kingston Rovers, both repeat fixtures from 2012. The other four matches were new fixtures for the Magic Weekend and included St. Helens playing Warrington and Bradford vs Huddersfield, continuing the tradition of having local rivalry matches at the Magic Weekend.

2014: Manchester

On 31 May 2013, less than a week after the 2013 Magic Weekend, the RFL announced that the Magic Weekend would once again return to the Etihad Stadium, Manchester for 2014, with matches being played on Saturday 17 and Sunday 18 May.

On 23 January 2014, the fixtures were announced with, in a repeat of the 2013 fixtures, four matches set to take place on the Saturday with the remaining three scheduled for Sunday, including four local derbies (Huddersfield-Bradford, Hull Kingston Rovers-Hull FC, Wakefield Trinity-Castleford and Warrington-St Helens R.F.C.) plus the meeting of the last two winners of the Super League Grand Final, Wigan Warriors and Leeds Rhinos. The other matches consisted of Widnes vs Salford and London vs Catalans Dragons.

Controversy was created in the city of Hull following the announcement that the 2014 FA Cup Final was to take place at exactly the same time and date as the fixture between Hull FC and Hull KR, this being the first FA Cup final Hull City had qualified for. The RFL announced on 15 April 2014 that they would not be changing the fixture.

The aggregate attendance of 64,552 was the highest ever for a Magic Weekend, while the Saturday attendance of 36,339 was the highest ever single-day figure until both records were surpassed the consequent year in Newcastle-upon-Tyne.

2015: Newcastle
In 2015, the Magic Weekend was forced to move due to construction at the Etihad Stadium, which would commence immediately after the 2014–15 Premier League season had concluded, which meant the Magic Weekend was due to be changed, with Coventry's Ricoh Arena and Newcastle upon Tyne's St James' Park being considered by the RFL. Blake Solly had confirmed that the Etihad and Super League did have a good partnership, but there were alternatives available to host the event. On 10 September 2014, it was confirmed that the Magic Weekend had been awarded to Newcastle for 2015, and would be played 30 and 31 May 2015. With the Super League Reformatting in 2015, the Magic Weekend featured twelve teams and six matches, as opposed to the seven games in previous years.

The event was considered the most successful to date, with a record aggregate attendance of 67,788, a record single-day crowd of 40,871 on the Saturday and an estimated benefit of £4.2 million to the Newcastle economy.

2016: Newcastle
After a successful event in Newcastle in 2015, the Magic Weekend returned to St James' Park for the second year running with most fixtures being based upon last season's league standings rather than local derbies. The top four from last season play each other; Leeds Rhinos v Wigan Warriors and St. Helens v Huddersfield Giants. Continuing with this trend, 5th placed Castleford Tigers play 6th placed Warrington Wolves and the two teams in the bottom four last season, Widnes Vikings and Salford Red Devils, play in a repeat of last year's fixture. Last season's bottom placed Wakefield Trinity Wildcats play Catalans Dragons: as the Dragons struggle away from home, this fixture is to give both teams a chance of winning. The only derby this year is the Hull Derby at the end of the weekend.

2017: Newcastle
For the third consecutive season, Magic Weekend returned to Newcastle. This is the Leigh Centurions' first time playing at the Magic Weekend. This is because Magic Weekend first made an appearance in 2007, two seasons after Leigh's relegation.

2018: Newcastle
For a fourth year in succession, Magic Weekend took place in Newcastle. As a curtain raiser, the first game to be played on the first day was a Championship fixture between Toronto Wolfpack and Toulouse Olympique.

2019: Liverpool

Anfield was chosen as the venue for the 2019 Magic Weekend after two test matches were played there in 2016 and 2018. After previously choosing games that were local derbies or competitive games, in 2019 the fixtures were determined by the previous season's league position.

Robert Elstone, Super League Chief Executive, said "On behalf of the Super League clubs, we’re delighted to be taking the Dacia Magic Weekend to one of the most famous stadiums in the world.

2020: Cancelled
The 2020 event was due to return to Newcastle's St James's Park, however it was cancelled due to the COVID-19 pandemic in addition to wider implications for the 2020 season.

2021: Newcastle
The Super League's Magic Weekend saw a belated return to Newcastle for the 2021 season. Fixtures for the event were announced on 23 February with matches scheduled to be played during the weekend of 4–5 September.

2022: Newcastle
The Super League's Magic Weekend stayed in Newcastle, for the 2022 season. Fixtures for the event were announced on 23 February with matches played during the weekend of 9–10 July.

Team statistics

Venues

Attendances

Highest weekend attendance

Sponsorship
Since 2016 Dacia has been the title sponsor of the Magic Weekend.

See also

 Magic Round
 Summer Bash
 Super League
 Rugby league in the British Isles
 Rugby league in England
 Rugby league in Scotland
 Rugby league in Wales

Notes

References

External links

 TheMagicWeekend.co.uk Official site

Rugby league in the United Kingdom
Super League
2007 in Welsh rugby league
2008 in Welsh rugby league
2009 in Scottish sport
2010 in Scottish sport
2011 in Welsh rugby league